Michelle Key (born August 18, 1988) is an American racquetball player. Key represented the USA at the 2015 Pan American Games in Toronto, where she was part of the silver medal winning Women's Team. Key was ranked 7th at the end of the 2014-15 Ladies Professional Racquetball Tour (LPRT) season.

Racquetball 
Key is a right handed player.

Competing at the 2006 International Racquetball World Junior Championships in Arizona, Key won her age group in the singles event. Key also participated in the 3 Wallball World Championships in Las Vegas, Nevada in 2014. Key was back to compete at the 2016 edition of the 3 Wallball World Championships, where she defeated Paola Longoria in the semi-finals.

International career
Key earned her first call up to the United States junior team in 2004, and was a member of the team for over three years.

Key competed at the 2014 World Championships in the singles event, where she won a silver medal.

Key has competed for the USA three times. She was on Team USA at the 2015 Pan American Games in Toronto, where she played Women's Singles. Key lost two of her three matches in the group stage.  Her sole win was against Canada's Jennifer Saunders. As a result, was seeded against her teammate Rhonda Rajsich in the Round of 16 in playoffs. Rajsich won that match 15-8, 15-7. However, in the Women's Team event Key helped the USA get the silver medal. Key's win over Canadian Jennifer Saunders, 15-2, 15-6, in the semi-finals, put the USA into the final. But in the first match of the final, Key lost to Samantha Salas, 15-3, 15-9, and Mexico's Paola Longoria and Samantha Salas who successfully defended their title and defeated the American pair.

Key also represented the USA at the 2016 Pan American Championships in San Luis Potosí, where she partnered with Kelani Bailey in Women's Doubles. They reached the finals with a win over Veronica Sotomayor and Maria Paz Muñoz of Ecuador in the semi-finals, 11-15, 15-14, 11-5. In the final, Key and Bailey lost to the Mexican team of Paola Longoria and Samantha Salas, 15-5, 15-10. Key also played singles in San Luis Potosí, and lost in the quarterfinals to Gabriela Martinez of Guatemala, 15-7, 10-15, 11-7.

Key played Women's Singles for the USA at the 2016 World Championships in Cali, Colombia, where she lost in the Round of 32 to Mariana Tobon of Venezuela, 4-15, 15-9, 11-4.  She also lost to Bolivia's Adriana Riveros during the competition.

US Championships
Key played for the University of Arizona at Intercollegiates. Key was the 2011 USA Racquetball Intercollegiate Champion in Women's Singles, as she defeated Sharon Jackson in the final, 15-11, 15-14. That win avenged a loss to Jackson in the 2010 final. Key also played in the doubles tournament at the 2014 edition of the US Open with Lambert.  The pair lost to eventual winners Paola Longoria and  Verónica Sotomayor .

Key was runner-up at the 2016 USA Racquetball National Singles Championships in Highlands Ranch, Colorado, where she lost to Rhonda Rajsich in the final, 15-7, 15-7. Key reached the final by defeating Janel Tisinger in the semi-finals, 15-4, 15-13.

Key and her sister Danielle were runners up at the 2013 USA Racquetball National Doubles championship, losing the final to Aimee Ruiz and Janel Tisinger, 15-6, 15-8. They got to the final by upsetting that year's defending champions Rhonda Rajsich and Kim Russell-Waselenchuk, 9-15, 15-5, 11-8.

Professional career
Key was a top 10 player on Ladies Professional Racquetball Tour in 2014-15.  In January 2016, she was ranked eighth in the world.

Perhaps Key's best pro result is a semi-final finish at the 2016 Paola Longoria Experience tournament in San Luis Potosí.  She got to the semis by defeating Susana Acosta, 11-5, 11-1, 11-6, in the Round of 16, and Rajsich in the quarterfinals, 11-2, 2-11, 6-11, 11-4, 11-9. In the semi-finals, Key lost to Frédérique Lambert, 11-3, 11-5, 11-3.  She also participated in the 2014 edition of the Paola Longoria Experience in the women's double event with Canadian partner Frederique Lambert.  The pair opened the tournament with a loss to Mexico's Paola Longoria and Samantha Salas despite winning the first set.

In May 2015, she played doubles with Lambert at a tournament in Herndon, Virginia. The pair finished second after losing in the finals to Paola Longoria and Samantha Salas.    Playing again with Lambert, the pair made the finals of the 2015 Battle of the Alamo tournament, finishing second after failing to appear for the final.  In 2015, she reached the finals of the Open de Cali in Colombia while playing with Lambert, only to lose to Paola Longoria and Samantha Salas Solis in sets of 10-15, 15-10 and 11-5. In March 2016, she participated in the Zócalo Capitalino tournament.  In September 2016, she participated in a tour event in Las Vegas.

Personal life
Key was born on August 18, 1988 in Phoenix, Arizona. While in high school, she played badminton, where she was one of the better players in her area. She attended Arizona State University, and was a freshman in 2006. As of 2016, she lives in Gilbert, Arizona.

Key is married to Daniel De La Rosa, who is also a medal winning racquetball but for Mexico. Key's sister younger Danielle has also played elite racquetball.

See also

 List of racquetball players

References

Living people
American racquetball players
Sportspeople from Phoenix, Arizona
1988 births
Pan American Games silver medalists for the United States
Pan American Games medalists in racquetball
Racquetball players at the 2015 Pan American Games
Medalists at the 2015 Pan American Games